F11 or F-11 may refer to:

Business
 Fujifilm FinePix F11, a digital camera model
 a function key on standard keyboards

Military
 F 11 Nyköping, a Swedish Air Force wing
 F-11 Tiger, a 1954 U.S. Navy jet fighter originally designated F11F
 F11C Goshawk, a 1932 U.S. Navy biplane fighter
 Hughes XF-11, a 1946 U.S. Army Air Forces reconnaissance aircraft prototype

Science and academia
 Trichlorofluoromethane, a refrigerant used before 1995
 Factor XI, a clotting agent found in blood

Sports
 F11 (classification), a classification in para-athletics

Technology
 , a function key on a computer keyboard (enters and exits fullscreen mode in many web browsers)

Transportation
 Chery F11, a 2008 Chinese Chery Automobile model
 Fairchild F-11 Husky, a 1946 Canadian bush plane
 Falconar F11 Sporty, a Canadian amateur-built aircraft design
 Fokker F.11, a 1928 flying boat

Other uses
 Finger Eleven, a Canadian alternative rock band
 Forest Eleven, a group of rainforest countries

See also
 11F (disambiguation)